The Anti-Slavery Bugle was an abolitionist newspaper published in Ohio from June 20, 1845, to May 4, 1861. The paper's motto was "No Union with Slaveholders".

History
The Anti-Slavery Bugle was first published in New Lisbon, Ohio, (later renamed Lisbon) and moved after five issues to Salem, Ohio. That city was home to many Quaker families and an active station on the Underground Railroad, providing the paper with more subscribers. James Barnaby was the publisher of the paper and received support from the Ohio Anti-Slavery Society, such as Abby Kelley. This allowed the paper to continue to be in circulation for 18 years and was shipped to other states, including Illinois, Iowa, Indiana and Wisconsin.

The paper stated its goal in the first issue: "Our mission is a great and glorious one. It is to preach deliverance to the captive, and the opening of the prison door to them that are bound; to hasten in the day when 'liberty shall be proclaimed throughout all the land, unto all inhabitants thereof." In 1858, it featured the first publication of Frances Harper's abolitionist poem "Bury Me in a Free Land". Later, the paper expanded its mission from anti-slavery topics to include advocacy for the Women's Right Movement. It ran letters and speeches such as Sojourner Truth's "Ain't I a Woman?"

Notable editors
 Marius R. Robinson
 Benjamin S. Jones
 J. Elizabeth Hitchcock
 Oliver Johnson

See also
 African-American newspapers

References

External links
 The Anti-Slavery Bugle at Chronicling America
 Benjamin S. Jones papers from the Haverford College Quaker & Special Collections

Abolitionist newspapers published in the United States
Columbiana County, Ohio
Defunct newspapers published in Ohio